Queen of the Conquered is a 2019 fantasy novel by Kacen Callender. Callender's adult debut, published by Orbit in 2019, the book was the 2020 winner of the World Fantasy Award. In October 2020, a Time panel rated the book one of the top 100 fantasy novels of all-time.

Summary 
The book is set in a Caribbean-inspired world and tells the story of a black protagonist fighting back against colonizers. In an interview with The Nerd Daily, Callender described the plot as "the main character, Sigourney Rose, seeks revenge against the Fjern, who have enslaved her people and massacred her family. She manipulates her way onto a royal island with a power to read and control minds and hopes to win the favor of the king, who will be choosing the next successor to the throne—but once she arrives, royal nobles around Sigourney are murdered one-by-one, and she needs to discover who the murderer is before she is killed as well."

Reception 
It received starred reviews from Kirkus Reviews and School Library Journal. Alex Brown of Tor.com said that the book "makes for an occasionally challenging read", with Sigourney's character being generally passive, but that "everything else was nothing short of remarkable", saying that "often, stories about racial violence and slavery break people into white and POC, colonizer and colonized. With Sigourney and Løren, Callender explores the in between." Kerine Wint of FIYAH Literary Magazine said that the book had a "wonderfully-done deconstructed approach to the journey of a tragic hero" and that it was "a new insert in the slavery-centric fantasy that does not ask us to sympathize with evil behaviour and evil people". Jason Heller of NPR said the book was "a refreshing break from the stereotypical, pseudo-European setting of most epic fantasy" and remarked positively on "Sigourney's first-person, present-tense perspective," saying that it was "morally conflicted and viscerally impactful, her voice is a thing of lean poetry that's made all the more dimensional by her ability to peer into the thoughts of others — and to influence their actions."

References 

2019 fantasy novels
World Fantasy Award for Best Novel-winning works
Orbit Books books